Martín José Giménez (born 17 August 1991) is an Argentine professional footballer who plays as a forward for Defensores Unidos.

Career
Giménez's career began in 2006 with Deportivo Independencia, before a spell with Primera D team Atlas where he was loaned out to Defensores Unidos. After his loan with Defensores Unidos, Giménez joined Quilmes of Primera B Nacional before subsequently joining Defensores Unidos permanently. After three years at the club, he completed a move to Primera B de Chile side Unión San Felipe. Not long after joining Unión San Felipe, Giménez found himself out on loan to former club Defensores Unidos for the 2016 Primera C season. In three spells, he scored twenty-six times in one hundred and seven games.

After the 2016 campaign, Giménez joined Argentine Primera División club Arsenal de Sarandí on loan for the 2016–17 season. He returned to Unión San Felipe at the end of December 2016. On 16 February 2017, Giménez joined Paraguayan Primera División side Sol de América. He made his debut for the club on 25 February in the league against Cerro Porteño, he scored a hat-trick in an away win. Giménez made his Copa Sudamericana debut on 7 April, scoring two goals in a win versus Estudiantes. His time with them was littered with indiscipline, with the forward going AWOL on three occasions.

In August 2019, Giménez was loaned back to his hometown with Defensores Unidos; for his fourth spell with the Zárate-based outfit. On 16 March 2020, Giménez joined Paraguayan División Intermedia club Atyrá FC. He never appeared for them due to the COVID-19 pandemic. Within the next few months, Giménez signed a pre-contract with Brazilian Série B outfit Náutico. However, on 2 September, the move fell through after the forward asked for a pay increase. Giménez subsequently went back to Paraguay, penning terms with Primera División team San Lorenzo on 6 October.

On 22 January 2021, Giménez returned to Argentina with Primera B Metropolitana's Almirante Brown. Giménez left Almirante a year later to join Defensores Unidos on 5 January 2022.

Career statistics
.

References

External links
 

1991 births
Living people
Sportspeople from Buenos Aires Province
Argentine footballers
Association football forwards
Argentine expatriate footballers
Expatriate footballers in Chile
Expatriate footballers in Paraguay
Argentine expatriate sportspeople in Chile
Argentine expatriate sportspeople in Paraguay
Primera D Metropolitana players
Primera C Metropolitana players
Primera Nacional players
Primera B de Chile players
Argentine Primera División players
Paraguayan Primera División players
Club Atlético Atlas footballers
Defensores Unidos footballers
Quilmes Atlético Club footballers
Unión San Felipe footballers
Arsenal de Sarandí footballers
Club Sol de América footballers
Club Sportivo San Lorenzo footballers
Club Almirante Brown footballers